Sun Jian (born 23 October 1991) is a Chinese sport shooter.

He participated at the 2018 ISSF World Shooting Championships, winning a medal.

References

External links

Living people
1991 births
Chinese male sport shooters
ISSF rifle shooters
Sport shooters from Shanghai
Shooters at the 2018 Asian Games
Asian Games competitors for China
21st-century Chinese people